The South Pole–Queen Maud Land Traverse (SPQMLT) was a three-part scientific exploration of Antarctica undertaken by the United States in the 1960s.
The three parts, referred to individually as South Pole–Queen Maud Land Traverse I, II, and III (SPQMLT-1, -2, and -3), traveled a zigzag route across nearly 4200 km of the Antarctic Plateau in the austral summers of 1964–1965, 1965–1966, and 1967–1968.
The participants included scientists from Belgium, Norway, and the United States.
Their objectives included determining the thickness of the Antarctic Ice Sheet, the elevation and slope of its surface, the rate of ice accumulation, and the subglacial topography.
Other objectives included measuring the density and temperature of the ice at depth, measuring the geomagnetic field and gravity, and obtaining snow samples and ice cores.

Operations
The traverse parties consisted of two to three traverse engineers and seven to eight scientists, who were affiliated with The Ohio State University, the University of Wisconsin, the U.S. Coast and Geodetic Survey, the Free University of Brussels, and the Norwegian Polar Institute.
Three diesel-powered Tucker Sno-Cats, one of which was equipped with a drilling rig, provided locomotion.
Fuel was hauled in large rolling rubber tires, and supplies were carried on several 1-ton and 2-ton sleds.
Additional fuel and supplies were delivered en route by airdrops from LC-130 aircraft of the U.S. Navy's Operation Deep Freeze.
Direction was maintained with solar and magnetic compasses.

Two of the vehicles each carried several altimeters and a proton magnetometer, and traveled such that one led the other by 8 km.
Every 8 km they paused for simultaneous readings of the altimeters and magnetometers; and for measurements of gravity, surface slope, and snow density, and for weather observations.
The surface slope was measured by scanning the horizon with a theodolite and recording the azimuth and vertical angle of the highest and lowest points.
Beginning with SPQMLT-2, the ice thickness was profiled en route with a new radio sounder.

At the beginning and ending points, and approximately every 50 to 75 km in between, a station was set up for the following work:
a vertical 40-m hole was bored into the ice,
the density and temperature of the ice at various depths in the borehole were measured, 
the ice sheet was sounded seismically, 
the accumulation rate was studied in hand-excavated 2-m pits, 
the intensity and direction of the geomagnetic field were measured, 
snow samples and ice cores were collected and analyzed, 
and the geographic position (latitude and longitude) and a geographic azimuth were determined by celestial (solar) observations with a theodolite.

SPQMLT-1
SPQMLT-1 began on December 4, 1964, at Amundsen–Scott South Pole Station and, after traveling a zigzag route of 1530 km, ended on January 27, 1965, at the unoccupied Pole of Inaccessibility Station.
The surface encountered varied from soft and smooth to hard and rough, with sastrugi over 1-m high.
The sky was often clear or patched with light cirrus clouds.
Solar halos were observed frequently, and whiteouts occurred several times.
The average air temperature was −28 °C, with a maximum of −18°C on January 5 and a minimum of −45 °C on January 26.
The greatest wind speed measured was 9 m/s, on December 29 and January 17.
On January 8 two skuas were sighted.
At Pole of Inaccessibility Station a snow-accumulation stake net was installed and the vehicles were secured.
On February 1 personnel and cargo were airlifted to McMurdo Station.

SPQMLT-2
SPQMLT-2 began on December 15, 1965, at Pole of Inaccessibility Station (where SPQMLT-1 had ended the previous summer) and, after traveling a dogleg route of 1340 km, ended on January 29, 1966, at the newly constructed Plateau Station .
At Pole of Inaccessibility Station a detailed map was drawn, the existing strain-rate and accumulation-stake networks were measured, and a 5-km accumulation stake line was installed.
The main crevasses were several tens of meters wide, 5 to 7 km long, and oriented approximately east-west.
The crevassed zone is above a major anomaly in the bedrock topography, an abrupt rise of over 1200 m over a horizontal distance of less than 9 km.
After reaching Plateau Station, a strain network was installed, and all three vehicles were backloaded to McMurdo Station for reconditioning.

SPQMLT-3
SPQMLT-3 began on December 5, 1967, at Plateau Station (where SPQMLT-2 had ended nearly two years earlier) and, after traveling a dogleg route of 1326 km, ended on January 29, 1968, at geographic position .
Aerial reconnaissance of the planned route showed no significant crevassing except near the end point.
On December 14, at 320 km from Plateau Station, the traverse encountered a sled-mounted building, similar to the one at Pole of Inaccessibility Station, which was left by a Soviet traverse in March 1967.
Cairns built of empty fuel drums were erected at the sites of resupply airdrops.
The temperature ranged from −40 °C to −10 °C, and the wind rarely exceeded 18 km/hr.
Severe whiteouts occurred during the final week of travel.
Two pickup flights, on January 30 and 31, airlifted personnel, equipment, snow samples, and one Sno-Cat to McMurdo Station.

Scientific Results

Surface Elevation and Slope
The elevation (above sea level) of the surface along the routes of SPQMLT-1 and SPQMLT-2, based on the altimeter measurements, averaged  2780 m and 3090 m, respectively.
On SPQMLT-1 it ranged from 2628 m at the second turning point to 3718 m at Pole of Inaccessibility Station.
On SPQMLT-2 it decreased from there to 2512 m at the turning point, from where it increased eastward (toward Plateau Station) at a gradient of 1 to 3 m/km.

On SPQMLT-3 the elevation ranged from 3625 m at Plateau Station to 2210 m at the ending point. From Plateau Station to the turning point, the surface sloped downward with an average gradient of -0.5 to -1 m/km, and became much more negative on the southwest leg of the traverse. Two pronounced valleys, about 50 m deep and 10 km wide, and several smaller valleys, were encountered near the end of the traverse.

Based on the altimeter and slope measurements, the surface in the region of the traverse slopes downward to the west, toward the Weddell Sea, with a gradient of about -2 m/km.

Ice Thickness and Subglacial Topography
The elevation of the subglacial terrain, based on the seismic soundings, radio sounding (SPQMLT-2 and SPQMLT-3), and gravity measurements, ranged from nearly 1 km below sea level to more than 1 km above sea level.
On SPQMLT-1 and SPQMLT-2 the thickness of the ice averaged 2740 m and 2770 m, respectively.

Accumulation Rate
The average rate of ice accumulation in the area of the traverse has been estimated at 3.7 g/cm2/yr with a method that involves profiling the radioactivity  in the core samples and identifying layers that correspond to a 1955 atmospheric atomic test.

This estimate is now considered to be more accurate than earlier estimates based on the pit studies.

Geomagnetism
The measurements of the intensity and direction of the geomagnetic field were added to the database (now maintained by the National Geophysical Data Center) upon which are based the 1970 and subsequent World Magnetic Charts, World Magnetic Models, and International Geomagnetic Reference Field.
The measurements from SPQMLT-3 were compared to the (existing) 1965 World Magnetic Charts (corrected to 1968) and found to disagree on average by more than 1° in magnetic declination and magnetic inclination, and 500 nT in total intensity.

Citations

References

Further reading
 

 

 

 

 

 

 

 

Antarctic expeditions
Glaciology
United States and the Antarctic
Queen Maud Land
1960s in Antarctica